Yorketown is an unincorporated community and census-designated place (CDP) within Manalapan Township, in Monmouth County, New Jersey, United States. At the 2020 census, the CDP's population was 6,739.

Geography
According to the United States Census Bureau, Yorketown had a total area of 2.397 square miles (6.210 km2), including 2.388 square miles (6.186 km2) of land and 0.009 square miles (0.024 km2) of water (0.39%).

Demographics

Census 2010

Census 2000
At the 2000 census there were 6,712 people, 1,950 households, and 1,790 families living in the CDP. The population density was 1,079.8/km2 (2,791.5/mi2). There were 1,967 housing units at an average density of 316.4/km2 (818.1/mi2). The racial makeup of the CDP was 93.79% White, 2.22% African American, 0.04% Native American, 2.53% Asian, 0.04% Pacific Islander, 0.33% from other races, and 1.04% from two or more races. Hispanic or Latino of any race were 3.52% of the population.

Of the 1,950 households 53.4% had children under the age of 18 living with them, 82.4% were married couples living together, 7.1% had a female householder with no husband present, and 8.2% were non-families. 6.7% of households were one person and 2.1% were one person aged 65 or older. The average household size was 3.40 and the average family size was 3.56.

The age distribution was 31.3% under the age of 18, 6.2% from 18 to 24, 29.1% from 25 to 44, 25.5% from 45 to 64, and 7.8% 65 or older. The median age was 37 years. For every 100 females, there were 95.2 males. For every 100 females age 18 and over, there were 93.9 males.

The median household income was $89,351 and the median family income  was $95,430. Males had a median income of $70,789 versus $42,295 for females. The per capita income for the CDP was $31,132. About 2.0% of families and 2.7% of the population were below the poverty line, including 3.9% of those under age 18 and 8.2% of those age 65 or over.

References

Neighborhoods in Manalapan Township, New Jersey
Census-designated places in Monmouth County, New Jersey